The acronym OLG may refer to:

 Oberlandesgericht, a higher regional court of appeals in Germany
 Online gaming
 Ontario Lottery and Gaming Corporation, a Canadian provincial government agency which operates lottery games and casinos.
 Our Lady of Guadalupe
 Overlapping gene in genomes
 Overlapping generations in population genetics
 Overlapping generations model in economics